A la salida nos vemos  (English: See You After School) is a 1986 Colombian drama film directed by Carlos Palau. The film is a teen drama set in a Catholic boarding school in rural Valle del Cauca in the 1960s.

Plot 
A group of teenagers at Catholic boarding school in the provinces spend their time trying to adapt to the demands of the priest in charge of the school while discovering life with their adventures and pains. It presents the romantic and sexual initiation of the group of adolescent boys and their problems.

Cast 
 Alejandro Madriñan as Miguel
 Abril Mendez as Angela
 Santiago Madriñan
 John Klonis
 Irene Arcila
 Alvaro Ruiz as Miguel's father

Awards 
A la salida nos vemos premiered on 19 June 1986 at the 26° Cartagena Film Festival where it won the India Catalina award as Best Film by a New Director. The film had its wide released on 18 November 1987.

References

Citations

Sources 
Fundación Patrimonio Fílmico Colombiano. Nieto, Jorge (edit), Largometrajes Colombianos En Cine y Video: 1915-2004, Fundación Patrimonio Fílmico Colombiano, Ministerio de Cultura, 2006,

External links 
 

1986 films
Colombian drama films
Films set in Colombia
1980s Spanish-language films
1986 drama films